Elisabeth of Sicily (1310–1349) was a daughter of Frederick III of Sicily and Eleanor of Anjou. Her siblings included: Peter II of Sicily and Manfred of Athens. After her death her title was given to Georgia Lanza.

Marriage and issue 
On June 27, 1328, Elisabeth married Stephen II, Duke of Bavaria, son of Louis IV, Holy Roman Emperor and Beatrix of Silesia-Glogau. The couple had three sons and a daughter, they were:
 Stephen III of Bavaria-Ingolstadt (1337–September 26, 1413, Niederschönfeld).
 Frederick of Bavaria-Landshut (1339–December 4, 1393, Budweis).
 John II of Bavaria-Munich (1341–1397), married Katharina of Görz
 Agnes (b. 1338), married c. 1356 King James I of Cyprus.

Elisabeth died in 1349, her husband later married Margarete of Nuremberg; they had no children.

Descendants 
Two of her sons became Dukes of Bavaria and her daughter, Agnes, became Queen of Cyprus by her marriage to James I of Cyprus. Her granddaughter and namesake was Isabeau of Bavaria, queen of France by her marriage to Charles VI of France. Isabeau's children included: Isabella, Queen of England; Catherine, also queen of England; Michelle, duchess of Burgundy and Charles VII of France.

References

Sources

External links
 

|-

1310 births
1349 deaths
House of Barcelona (Sicily)
House of Wittelsbach
Capetian House of Anjou
14th-century Italian women
Burials at Munich Frauenkirche
14th-century Sicilian people
Daughters of kings